Cocuzza is an Italian surname. Notable people with the surname include:

Charlie Cocuzza, American football coach
Maria Cocuzza (born 1973), Italian gymnast
Riccardo Cocuzza (born 1993), Italian footballer

See also
Cocozza

Italian-language surnames